OK OK may refer to:

"OK OK?", a song by Half Alive from their 2019 album Now, Not Yet
"Ok Ok", a song by Kanye West from the 2021 album Donda
Oru Kal Oru Kannadi, a 2012 Tamil romantic comedy film written and directed by M. Rajesh
"Oru Kal Oru Kannadi" (song), song by Yuvan Shankar Raja from the film Siva Manasula Sakthi

See also
OK (disambiguation)